In mathematical logic, the ancestral relation (often shortened to ancestral) of a binary relation R is its transitive closure, however defined in a different way, see below. 

Ancestral relations make their first appearance in Frege's Begriffsschrift. Frege later employed them in his Grundgesetze as part of his definition of the finite cardinals. Hence the ancestral was a key part of his search for a logicist foundation of arithmetic.

Definition
The numbered propositions below are taken from his Begriffsschrift and recast in contemporary notation.

A property P is called R-hereditary if, whenever x is P and xRy holds, then y is also P:

Frege defined b to be an R-ancestor of a, written aR*b, if b has every R-hereditary property that all objects x such that aRx have: 

The ancestral is a transitive relation:

Let the notation I(R) denote that R is functional (Frege calls such relations "many-one"):

If R is functional, then the ancestral of R is what nowadays is called connected:

Relationship to transitive closure

See also Boolos's book below, page 8.

Discussion
Principia Mathematica made repeated use of the ancestral, as does Quine's (1951) Mathematical Logic.

However, it is worth noting that the ancestral relation cannot be defined in first-order logic. It is controversial whether second-order logic with standard semantics is really "logic" at all. Quine famously claimed that it was really 'set theory in sheep's clothing.' In his books setting out formal systems related to PM and capable of modelling significant portions of Mathematics, namely - and in order of publication - 'A System of Logistic', 'Mathematical Logic' and 'Set Theory and its Logic', Quine's ultimate view as to the proper cleavage between logical and extralogical systems appears to be that once axioms that allow incompleteness phenomena to arise are added to a system, the system is no longer purely logical.

See also
 Begriffsschrift
Gottlob Frege
Transitive closure

References
George Boolos, 1998. Logic, Logic, and Logic. Harvard Univ. Press.
Ivor Grattan-Guinness, 2000. In Search of Mathematical Roots. Princeton Univ. Press.
Willard Van Orman Quine, 1951 (1940). Mathematical Logic. Harvard Univ. Press. .

External links
Stanford Encyclopedia of Philosophy: "Frege's Logic, Theorem, and Foundations for Arithmetic" -- by Edward N. Zalta. Section 4.2.

Binary relations

ja:概念記法